The Sherman Fairchild Foundation, founded in 1955, is a charitable foundation of Sherman Fairchild, founder and chairman of the Fairchild Corporations. Sherman Mills Fairchild formed two charitable foundations, the Fairchild Foundation and the Sherman Fairchild Foundation during his lifetime. Upon his death on March 28, 1971, he left the bulk of his estate to his foundations.

In 2019, the Sherman Fairchild Foundation annual giving was $35,861,412 and total assets were over $829 million. It is headquartered in Chevy Chase, MD. Bonnie Burke Himmelman is the current president, Dale T. Knobel is a director. The Foundation grants are primarily to higher education, the fine arts, and cultural institutions. Recipients include Caltech, Dartmouth College, MIT, and Bryn Mawr College.

Books
Wayne G. Broehl (1995) The Sherman Fairchild Foundation, 1955-1993

References

External links
Dartmouth College Gift
Caltech Gift
MIT Gift
Bryn Mawr College Gift

Non-profit organizations based in Maryland
Foundations based in the United States
Organizations established in 1955